Uroctea is a genus of spiders that is found in Eurasia and Africa. It is sometimes put into its own family, Urocteidae. Their tent-like web is very similar to the ones Oecobius builds; but Uroctea species do not have a cribellum.

Species
The 18 species of this genus include:

 Uroctea compactilis L. Koch, 1878 (China, Korea, Japan)
 Uroctea concolor Simon, 1882 (Yemen)
 Uroctea durandi (Latreille, 1809)  (Mediterranean)
 Uroctea grossa Roewer, 1960 (Iran, Afghanistan)
 Uroctea hashemitorum Bosselaers, 1999 (Jordan)
 Uroctea indica Pocock, 1900 (India)
 Uroctea lesserti Schenkel, 1936 (China, Korea)
 Uroctea limbata (C. L. Koch, 1843) (Palearctic)
 Uroctea manii Patel, 1987 (India)
 Uroctea matthaii Dyal, 1935 (Pakistan)
 Uroctea paivani (Blackwall, 1868) (Canary Is., Cape Verde Is.)
 Uroctea quinquenotata Simon, 1910 (South Africa)
 Uroctea schinzi Simon, 1887 (South Africa)
 Uroctea semilimbata Simon, 1910 (South Africa)
 Uroctea septemnotata Tucker, 1920 (Namibia, South Africa)
 Uroctea septempunctata (O. P.-Cambridge, 1872) (Israel)
 Uroctea sudanensis Benoit, 1966 (Sudan, Somalia, Yemen)
 Uroctea thaleri Rheims, Santos & Harten, 2007 (Turkey, Israel, Iran, Yemen, India)

References

Oecobiidae
Spiders of Africa
Spiders of Asia
Araneomorphae genera